The 27th World Cup season began in November 1992 in Sestriere, Italy for men and Park City, Utah, USA for women, and concluded in March 1993 at the newly-created World Cup Final in Åre, Sweden. A break in the schedule was for the 1993 World Championships, held in Morioka, Japan, from February 4–14.

Marc Girardelli of Luxembourg won his fifth overall title, which was the most for a man in World Cup history until surpassed by Austrian Marcel Hirscher in 2017.  Anita Wachter of Austria won the women's overall title, her first.  Both winners won narrow victories because of their superior performance in the combined (Girardelli won all three for men en route to a 32-point victory over Kjetil André Aamodt; Wachter won one of the two for women (and was fourth in the other) en route to a 20-point victory over Katja Seizinger).  In December, defending women's World Cup champion Petra Kronberger of Austria abruptly retired, saying that she had lost her motivation to continue.

Lack of snow in Europe during the winter caused the schedule to be significantly rearranged.  All of the races at the classic sites of Wengen and Kitzbühel were cancelled.  Snowmaking was installed at Kitzbühel that summer as a result.  Also, Czechoslovakia peacefully dissolved into two countries—the Czech Republic and Slovakia—effective as of January 1, 1993, although the ski team remained unified until the end of the season.

At the end of the season in March, the International Ski Federation (FIS) added a World Cup Final, which immediately became a permanent part of the World Cup agenda. During this final, weather permitting, men's and women's races are held in each of the four disciplines: slalom, giant slalom, Super G, and downhill, as well as a team parallel slalom competition. Only a limited number of racers are invited to ski at the Finals, including the top 25 in the World Cup standings in each discipline, plus the current junior World Champions in each discipline, plus competitors for the overall title who failed to qualify on points within the discipline (if any). Because of the smaller field, World Cup points are only awarded to the top 15 finishers in each race.

Calendar

Men

Ladies

Men

Overall 

see complete table

In 1993, all the results count toward the overall title. Marc Girardelli won his fifth overall title.

Downhill 

see complete table

In 1993, all results were used to determine the title. Franz Heinzer won his third Downhill title in a row.

Super G 

see complete table

In Men's Super G World Cup 1992/93 all results count.

Giant Slalom 

see complete table

In 1993 all results counted toward the title.

Slalom 

see complete table

In 1993 all results counted towards the title.

Combined 

see complete table

In 1993, all three results count. Marc Girardelli  won his third Combined World Cup by winning all three competitions.

Ladies

Overall 

see complete table

In 1993 all results count.

Downhill 

see complete table

In 1993 all results count.

Super G 

see complete table

In 1993 all results count.

Giant Slalom 

see complete table

In 1993 all results count.

Slalom 

see complete table

In 1993 all results count. Vreni Schneider won her fourth Slalom World Cup.

Combined 

see complete table

In 1993 both results count.

Nations Cup

Overall

Men

Ladies

References

External links
FIS-ski.com - World Cup standings - 1993

1992–93
World Cup
World Cup